Guilford Lake may refer to:

Guilford Lake (New York), a lake in Chenango County
Guilford Lake (Ohio), a lake in Columbiana County

See also
Gilford (disambiguation)
Guildford (disambiguation), including uses of Guilford